Toddsville is a  hamlet located south of Fly Creek on the Oaks Creek in the Town of Otsego and Hartwick, Otsego County, New York, United States. Toddsville derived its name from Jehiel Todd, who came from Connecticut in an early day and settled in that locality. In 1790 the first mill in the town was opened in Toddsville.

References

Hamlets in Otsego County, New York